"8 Out of 10" is a song by Canadian rapper Drake from his album, Scorpion (2018), the song has reached the top 20 in Canada and the Czech Republic.

Commercial performance

North America
On July 14, 2018, "8 Out of 10" entered the charts at number 19 on the Billboard Canadian Hot 100 and remained in the top 100 until July 28, 2018. The song spent three weeks on the US Billboard Hot 100, entering the charts at number 21, its immediate peak, on July 14, 2018.

Europe
On July 12, 2018, "8 Out of 10" entered at number 17 on the Czech Republic chart, becoming Drake's second-highest charting song from Scorpion, after "Don't Matter to Me" which peaked at number 6.

Internationally
The song has peaked in the top 40 in Australia, Greece, Norway, Portugal, Slovakia, Sweden and has charted on the charts of Austria, France, Germany, Italy and the Netherlands.

Charts

References

2018 songs
Drake (musician) songs
Songs written by Drake (musician)
Songs written by Boi-1da
Songs written by Leon Ware
Trap music songs